The New York Kick was a professional indoor soccer team based in Albany, New York playing at the Knickerbocker Arena and competed in the National Professional Soccer League (1984–2001).

The team was previously known as the Indiana Kick in 1989–90. The Indiana Kick played their games at the Allen County War Memorial Coliseum in Fort Wayne, Indiana. The Kick were created under the ownership of Kent Phillips after the Fort Wayne Flames folded following the 1988–89 season.

Coaches

 Warren Lipka (1989–90)

Year-by-year

See also
History of sports in Fort Wayne, Indiana

References

Sports in Albany, New York
Kick
Defunct indoor soccer clubs in the United States
American Indoor Soccer Association teams
Association football clubs established in 1989
Association football clubs disestablished in 1991
1989 establishments in Indiana
1991 disestablishments in New York (state)